Daniel Joshua Drucker (born 23 June 1956) is a Canadian endocrinologist. A Fellow of the Royal Society, he is a professor of medicine at the Lunenfeld-Tanenbaum Research Institute, Mount Sinai Hospital, Toronto. He is known for his research into intestinal hormones and their use in the treatment of diabetes and other metabolic diseases.

Early life and education
Drucker was born and grew up in Montreal, and then enrolled in the University of Ottawa. After graduation he moved to Toronto, where he studied medicine at the University of Toronto, graduating in 1980. He received postgraduate training (medicine and endocrinology) at Johns Hopkins Hospital (1980–81), and the University of Toronto (1980–84).

Career
Beginning in 1984, Drucker worked as a research fellow at the Massachusetts General Hospital and Harvard Medical School, studying molecular endocrinology. In 1987 he returned to Toronto, taking on the position of assistant professor of medicine at the University of Toronto and working as a staff doctor.

Early in his career Drucker studied the effect of hormones in the gut on the onset and development of Type 2 diabetes.  In 1996, he identified the effects that GLP-2 has on small bowel proliferation in rats. His research led to the development of two types of drugs for the treatment of the disease.

Drucker joined the staff of the Samuel Lunenfeld Research Institute at Mount Sinai Hospital in 2006. In 2008 he conducted studies aimed at the development and testing of long-acting insulin-control medication. He later studied the long-term effects of related weight-loss medicines on bowel health.

A Canada Research Chair at the University of Toronto, Drucker also developed treatments for short bowel syndrome, a disorder in which fluids are poorly absorbed after resection of the small intestine.

Awards and honours
Drucker has received many national and international awards in recognition of his research accomplishments revealing the mechanisms of action and therapeutic potential of enteroendocrine hormones. These include the Prix Galien Canada for outstanding academic research (2008), the Donald F. Steiner Award for Outstanding Diabetes Research from the University of Chicago (2007), the Clinical Investigator Award from the Endocrine Society (2009), the Claude Bernard Prize from the European Association for the Study of Diabetes (2012), the Oon International Award and Lecture from the University of Cambridge (2014), the Banting Medal for Scientific Achievement from the American Diabetes Association (2014) the Manpei Suzuki Foundation International Prize for Diabetes (2014), and the Harold Hamm International Prize for Biomedical Research in Diabetes (2019). In 2021 he was awarded the Canada Gairdner International Award. and in 2023 the Wolf Prize in Medicine.

Drucker was named an Officer of the Order of Canada in 2015. He was elected a Fellow of the Royal Society (FRS) in 2015.

Selected publications

References

External links

1956 births
Living people
Canadian Fellows of the Royal Society
University of Toronto alumni
Academic staff of the University of Toronto
Officers of the Order of Canada
Academics from Montreal
University of Ottawa alumni
Foreign associates of the National Academy of Sciences